Pavel Geffert (born 7 May 1968) is a Czech ice hockey player. He competed in the men's tournament at the 1994 Winter Olympics.

Career statistics

Regular season and playoffs

International

References

1968 births
Living people
Olympic ice hockey players of the Czech Republic
Ice hockey players at the 1994 Winter Olympics
Ice hockey people from Prague
HC Plzeň players
Rytíři Kladno players
HC Slavia Praha players
HC Sparta Praha players
Czechoslovak ice hockey forwards
Czech ice hockey forwards